Kilkenny City may refer to:

 Kilkenny City (Parliament of Ireland constituency)
 Kilkenny City (UK Parliament constituency)
 Kilkenny City A.F.C., an Irish football club